Sanatana Dharma College or S. D. College is an educational institution in Alappuzha, Kerala, India, affiliated with the University of Kerala. It is one of the oldest affiliated aided colleges under the University of Kerala. The college has been recognized by the University Grants Commission (UGC) and is accredited by NAAC with A+ grade. It is the first and only college under university of Kerala which got A+ grade by NAAC.

The college has twelve teaching departments which offers various undergraduate and nine postgraduate courses in arts, science and commerce.  Its departments of Commerce, Botany, Zoology, Mathematics, Physics, Chemistry, Economics, Malayalam and English are approved research centers of the University of Kerala.

The current manager of the college is P. Krishnakumar.  The college is headed by Dr. N. Saraswathy Antharjanam as the principal. The college Office Administration is managed by Senior Superintendent S.SanthoshKumar, Head Accountant R.Babu.

History
S. D. College was founded by K. Parthasarathy Iyengar and V. Sundara Raja Naidu as a contribution towards the educational uplift of the district of Alappuzha.  The college was established under the management of Sanatana Dharma Vidyasala and was inaugurated on 20 June 1946 by Sir C. P. Ramaswamy Iyer.

A sister institution, S. D. V. College of Arts and Applied Science, Sanatanapuram, Kalarcode, Alappuzha (a self-financing college affiliated to University of Kerala and recognised by Govt of Kerala) was launched by the management in 2013.

Notable alumni

 Kavalam Narayana Panicker
 Prem Nazir
 M. G. Radhakrishnan
 Vayalar Ravi
 S. Ramachandran Pillai
 Ambalapuzha Gopakumar
 Kunchako Boban
 Nedumudi Venu
 Fazil, director
 Fahadh Faasil
 Sreekumaran Thampi
 Ranji Panickar
 T. T. Sreekumar
 Sibi Malayil
 Sudeep Kumar, singer
 Bheeman Raghu
 Jagannatha Varma
 T. R. Omana
 Mahesh, actor
 S. D. Shibulal
 N. R. Madhava Menon
 M. K. Sanu
 K. P. Appan
 Alleppey Ashraf
Madhu Vasudevan
Muhamma Ramanan, Malayalam language children's literature writer
 Sreeya Remesh, actress

References

External links
 
Campus Genie (Learning and Educational Management System of the college)

Colleges in Kerala
Universities and colleges in Alappuzha district
Colleges affiliated to the University of Kerala
Buildings and structures in Alappuzha
Educational institutions established in 1946
1946 establishments in India